Anastasia Cannuscio (born July 1, 1992) is an American former competitive ice dancer. With her skating partner, Colin McManus, she is the 2013 Ice Challenge champion, a three-time bronze medalist on the ISU Challenger Series, and the 2016 U.S. national pewter medalist.

Personal life 
Anastasia Cannuscio was born in Philadelphia, Pennsylvania. She is the younger sister of American ice dancer Isabella Cannuscio.

Career 
Cannuscio teamed up with Colin McManus in March 2008. They were coached by Karen Ludington, Christie Moxley-Hutson, and Alexandr Kirsanov at the University of Delaware in Newark, Delaware. The two debuted on the ISU Junior Grand Prix series in autumn 2009.

Cannuscio/McManus won a silver medal at the 2010 Junior Grand Prix event in France and bronze on the junior level at the 2011 U.S. Championships. They were sent to the 2011 World Junior Championships and finished 7th.

Cannuscio/McManus made their senior-level debut at the 2011 Ondrej Nepela Memorial. They finished seventh at their first Grand Prix event, the 2012 Skate America. The following season, they won gold at the 2013 Ice Challenge.

In the 2014–2015 season, Cannuscio/McManus took bronze at both of their ISU Challenger Series events – the Finlandia Trophy and the U.S. International Classic. They placed fifth at their Grand Prix assignment, the 2014 Skate America, as well as the 2015 U.S. Championships.

Cannuscio/McManus received the pewter medal for fourth place at the 2016 U.S. Championships. They announced their retirement from competition in May 2017.

Programs 
(with McManus)

Competitive highlights 
GP: Grand Prix; CS: Challenger Series; JGP: Junior Grand Prix

With McManus

With Copely

References

External links 
 
 Anastasia Cannuscio / Colin McManus at IceNetwork.com

American female ice dancers
1992 births
Living people
People from Egg Harbor Township, New Jersey
Sportspeople from Philadelphia
21st-century American women